Vakoka Vakiteny is a publisher producing literature for children and youth in Malagasy language, created by Malagasy. It is located in Toliara in the south west of Madagascar (Atsimo Andrefana Region) and owned and run by Malagasy.

Etymology 
Vakoka (malagasy) means something precious, given by the ancestors. 

Vakiteny (malagasy) means reading.

History
Vakoka Vakiteny was founded in 2007 by workers of Green Schools Bara, a pilot school project within the Green Education Programme in Madagascar. Its purpose was production of modern and creative school materials in Malagasy language. Vakoka Vakiteny became an independent edition in 2008.

It gained largely by the fruitful cooperation with the National Centre for Reading Education and Research at the University of Stavanger in Norway as a partner for the accomplishment of the project "La joie de lire". This transfer of competence made it possible for Vakoka Vakiteny to develop quality books for Malagasy children.

Vakoka Vakiteny cooperates with the Malagasy government for production and distribution of school books and literature for children and youth and the elaboration of teacher's training programmes about the use of mother tongue literature in teaching.

Main Activities
The main activities of Vakoka Vakiteny are to develop, produce and edit quality literature in Malagasy for Malagasy children and youth, to promote the joy of reading and to develop the understanding of literature and art in a modern Malagasy environment. Malagasy writers and illustrators shall be stimulated to creativity and the publishing of their products shall be supported. It is intended to promote the extent of literature in Malagasy, to strengthen the use of the Malagasy language in all contexts and to form a forum for modern Malagasy literature and illustration.

External links
 Vakoka Vakiteny official website
 Green Schools Bara official website
 Green Education Programme in Madagascar official website
 National Centre for Reading Education and Research at the University of Stavanger official website

Companies of Madagascar
Educational publishing companies
Publishing companies established in 2007
Publishing companies of Madagascar
2007 establishments in Madagascar